Nationality words link to articles with information on the nation's poetry or literature (for instance, Irish or France).

Events

Works published

 Anne Bradstreet, Several Poems Compiled with Great Variety of Wit and Learning, a reprint of The Tenth Muse Lately Sprung Up in America, published in Boston, Massachusetts (original volume published in London in 1650) with significant additions, including "Contemplations", said to be her best poem; original, full title: "The Tenth Muse, lately Sprung up in America, or Several Poems Compiled with Great Variety of Wit and Learning, Full of Delight, Wherein especially is Contained a Complete Discourse and Description of the Four Elements, Constitutions, Ages of Man, Seasons of the Year, together with an exact Epitome of the Four Monarchies, viz., The Assyrian, Persian, Grecian, Roman, Also a Dialogue between Old England and New, concerning the late troubles. With divers other pleasand and serious Poems, By a Gentlewoman in those parts"; includes "In Praise of Mistress Bradstreet", a poem by Nathaniel Ward
 Samuel Butler, Hudibras. The Third and Last Part, "by the author of the first and second parts" (see also Hudibras, the First Part 1663, Hudibras. The Second Part 1664, Hudibras. The First and Second Parts 1674; Hudibras. In Three Parts 1684)
 "Ephelia", a pen name, possibly Joan Philips, A Poem to His Sacred Majesty, on the Plot, on the Popish Plot
 Dorthe Engelbrechtsdatter,  ("The Souls Spiritual Offering of Song")
 John Norris of Bemerton, Poems
 Henry Vaughan, including previously published works and Latin poems by Henry's brother, Thomas Vaughan

Births
Death years link to the corresponding "[year] in poetry" article:
August 12 - Jacob Maschius (born c.1630), Norwegian clergyman, poet and copperplate engraver

Deaths
Birth years link to the corresponding "[year] in poetry" article:
 April 9 (bur.) - Lady Hester Pulter (born c.1605), Irish-born English poet
 May 14 or 15 - Anna Maria van Schurman (born 1607), Dutch painter, poet and linguist
 August 16 - Andrew Marvell (born 1621), English metaphysical poet and parliamentarian
 Approximate date - Richard Flecknoe (born 1600), English dramatist and poet

See also

 Poetry
 List of years in poetry
 List of years in literature
 17th century in poetry
 17th century in literature
 Restoration literature

References

17th-century poetry
Poetry